The Thief is a young adult fantasy novel by Megan Whalen Turner published in 1996 by Greenwillow Books, an imprint of William Morrow (later, of HarperCollins). It is the first in the Queen's Thief series, the sixth book of which was published in 2020.

It was a runner-up for the 1997 Newbery Medal and a Newbery Honor Book.

In 2012, The Thief was ranked number 13 among the Top 100 Chapter Books in a survey published by School Library Journal, a monthly with a primarily U.S. audience.

Plot summary 
The main character, a boy named Gen (short for Eugenides), is released from prison by the magus of the King of Sounis. Gen had been imprisoned for stealing the King's seal. The magus, whose name is not revealed, finds Gen to be filthy, uncouth, and insolent, but he values Gen's skills as a thief. Without telling Gen where they are going, he takes him out of the city. They are joined by the magus's two apprentices, Sophos and Ambiades, and by a soldier, Pol.

The travelers are strained by personal conflict, as well as the dangers present due to the political and secret nature of their mission. The magus reveals that the object he wants Gen to steal is a precious stone called Hamiathes's Gift in the country of Attolia. The magus' plan is to use the long lost tradition embedded within the stone in order to claim the country of Eddis for his king. In exchange, the magus offers Gen fame and threatens him with a bounty on his head if he tries to escape. Agreeing, Gen risks death in a daring attempt to steal the stone from an almost inaccessible temple, while the entire party is pursued by the Guard of Attolia. After Gen steals the stone, the temple is washed away by a river. While traveling back, the party is captured by the Attolian guard. Ambiades turns out to be a traitor, but is later killed by Pol, who pushes him off a cliff and then jumps after him holding two Attolian soldiers, killing them, but dying himself. After being questioned by the queen of Attolia, Gen, Sophos and the Magus escape and go to Eddis. There they are taken to the palace and Gen gives the stone to the queen. It is revealed that Gen is Eugenides, the Queen's Thief, and Sophos is the heir to the kingdom of Sounis.

References

External links 

Megan Whalen Turner (official)
 

1996 American novels
Young adult fantasy novels
American young adult novels
Newbery Honor-winning works
HarperCollins books
1996 children's books
Novels set in fictional countries